The Noto Peninsula (能登半島, Noto-hantō) is a peninsula that projects north into the Sea of Japan from the coast of Ishikawa Prefecture in central Honshū, the main island of Japan. The main industries of the peninsula are agriculture, fisheries, and tourism.

Name
According to Alexander Vovin, the name is derived from Ainu  'cape' or  'big cape'.
It is written with two ateji (ad hoc kanji used for an unrelated word): 能 nō 'ability' and 登 tō/to 'ascend'.

Area and spots

Three regions 
The area of the Noto Peninsula is divided into 3 regions.
Kuchi-Noto (Entrance of Noto)South part of the area. Hakui City, Kahoku City, Hōdatsu-shimizu Town, Shika Town
Naka-Noto (Middle of Noto)Middle part of the area. Nanao City, Wakura Onsen Resort, Naka-Noto Town, Tatsuruhama
Oku-Noto (Deep Noto or North Noto)North part of the area. Wajima City, Suzu City, Noto Town, Anamizu Town, Noto Island

Notable spots 
Wakura OnsenLocated in Nanao City, this onsen (or "hot springs") is a famous health resort. The JR Nanao Line also terminates here.
Keta Great ShrineLocated in Hakui City and well known as a shrine for finding a lover and for a good marriage.
Wajima Morning Market This market is held in the center of Wajima City. Shoppers can buy a variety of fresh fish and vegetables cheaply.
Soji Templelocated in Monzen Town, is a head temple of Sōtō Zen Buddhism. Here there are also older cathedrals, as well as a newer one located in Kanagawa Prefecture.
Mitsuke Jima Meaning "found island" it is located in Suzu City. The name comes from the legend in which Saint Kukai found his magic stick here.
UnokeLocated in Kahoku City, the first office computer in Japan was manufactured by Unoke Electronics (now PFU), which was established in this town.
AnamizuKnown as one of the places where Percival Lowell made a stay during his visit to Japan, a memorial hall dedicated to him stands on a small hill near Anamizu Bay.

In film
The Noto Peninsula features prominently in the Japanese film noir Zero Focus (Zero no Shoten, 1961), directed by Yoshitaro Nomura. The film features breathtaking footage of the peninsula's coast, along with an interesting dissection of the area's social distinctions. Noto Peninsula is also the setting of Hirokazu Koreeda's second film Maborosi (1995) and Shōhei Imamura's final film Warm Water Under a Red Bridge (Akai Hashi no Shita no Nurui Mizu, 2001).  Suzu, the city located at the tip of the Noto Peninsula is the setting for the 2014 film Saihate Nite.

Transportation
JR Nanao Line comes from Kanazawa to Wakura Onsen Station via Unoke, Hakui, Nanao.
Noto Railway Small local railway from Wakura to Anamizu.
Noto Airport Located between Anamizu and Wajima. Air line to Tokyo International Airport.
Noto Satoyama Kaido Stretches from Kanazawa to Anamizu Town.
No-etu Expressway (partly opened) Comes from Oyabe (Toyama) to Wajima via Nanao and Noto Airport.
Suzu Road A free elongation of the Noto Tollway, from Anamizu to Suzu.
Route 249 National road that stretches around the Noto Peninsula.

Products
Wajima-nuriFamous for beautiful Japanese lacquerware produced around Wajima City.
IshiriA special fish sauce used for local dishes.
Kan-buri A fish (Japanese amberjack) that is eaten in winter. Yellowtails are called by different names as they grow. In Noto, they are called "Kozokura" -> "Fukuragi" -> "Ganto" -> "Buri".
Sweet Potato Candy There are many confectioners of this cake located in Deep Noto.
Sea Salt Noto is the only region in Japan to still produce salt using the Agehama method of salt manufacture, where sea water is brought up in buckets from the ocean to salt fields.

Events
On March 25, 2007, the 2007 Noto earthquake shook the peninsula, causing one death and at least 170 injuries.

Heritage designation
The Noto Peninsula was designated as a part of Globally Important Agricultural Heritage Systems, awarded by the Ministry of Agriculture, Forestry and Fisheries (Japan) in 2011.

References

Peninsulas of Japan
Landforms of Ishikawa Prefecture